The 1880 United States presidential election in Michigan took place on November 2, 1880, as part of the 1880 United States presidential election. Voters chose 11 electors to the Electoral College, which selected the president and vice president.

Michigan voted for Republican nominees James A. Garfield of Ohio and his running mate Chester A. Arthur over Democratic candidates Winfield Scott Hancock of Pennsylvania and running mate William Hayden English and Greenback candidates James B. Weaver of Iowa and his running mate Barzillai J. Chambers of Texas.

With 9.88% of the popular vote, Michigan would prove to be Weaver's third strongest state in terms of popular vote percentage after Texas and Iowa.

Results

Results by county

See also
 United States presidential elections in Michigan

Notes

References

Michigan
1880
1880 Michigan elections